Jalolsavam is a 2004 Indian Malayalam-language film, directed by Sibi Malayil, and starring Kunchacko Boban and Navya Nair.

Plot
The film, set in the backdrop of watery Kuttanad, starts with the annual boat race there. Alakkal Govindan captains the boat that has won the race twice already.  His dream now is to secure a hat trick of wins in the race.
His son Chandran is a pharmaceutical salesman (and part time local news reader) who falls in love with Geeta an industrious girl in the village. After being orphaned when her parents were drowned in a boating accident, she was taken in by Pappi Amma. Ponnappan, her wastrel of a son, is a local politician and activist. He tries to get Geeta married to a Dubai returned Jose.
Chandrans father, Alakkal Govindan pledges all his properties for the final race but loses. He dies downcast and his debts and duties fall on the innocent Chandran. Now, Chandran has to ensure that his father's name is not besmirched and ensure that Geetha does not end up marrying the villainous Jose.

Cast
 Kunchacko Boban as Aalakkal Chandran	
 Nedumudi Venu as Aalakkal Govindanashan
 Navya Nair as Geetha
 Riyaz Khan as Dubai Jose/Cheenkanni Jose
 Jagathy Sreekumar as Ponnappan
 Jagadish as Soman	
 Sujatha as Bhanumathi
 Chali Pala as Thommichayan
 Kalabhavan Prajod as Dasappan
 Sailesh Soman as Benny
 Geetha Salam as Kunjunju
 Machan Varghese as Kaali Thankan/Thakappan
 Vijaya Kumari as Pappiyamma 
 Punnapra Appachan as Tea Shop Owner
 Thiruvalla Johnson
 KPAC Sabu as Bhaskaran

Soundtrack
The film had musical score compossed by Alphons Joseph.Johnson composed the background score.

 Keranirakaladum : P Jayachandran 
 Kulirillam Vazhum  :K.J. Yesudas,K.S Chithra
 Thaarakapodi : M.G. Sreekumar

References

External links

2004 films
Films directed by Sibi Malayil
Films shot in Alappuzha
2000s Malayalam-language films